Automatic pistol may refer to:

 Semi-automatic pistol, a type of auto-loading handgun that can be fired in semi-automatic mode, firing one cartridge for each pull of the trigger. 
 Machine pistol, a handgun-style, magazine-fed and self-loading firearm, capable of fully automatic or burst fire, and chambered for pistol cartridges